Wendy Gilchrist (born 17 May 1950) is a former professional tennis player from Australia. From 1972 she competed as Wendy Paish following her marriage to British Davis Cup player John Paish.

Biography
Born in 1950, she is the daughter of tennis player Jim Gilchrist.

Gilchrist, a left-handed player, played on the professional tour in the 1970s and made it to the Virginia Slims Championships in 1972.

Her best performance in a Grand Slam tournament came at the 1970 Australian Open, where she was a semifinalist in the women's doubles with Lesley Hunt. She was a quarterfinalist in mixed doubles at the 1971 French Open and a quarterfinalist in the women's doubles at the 1972 Wimbledon Championships.

References

External links
 
 

1950 births
Living people
Australian female tennis players
Tennis people from New South Wales
20th-century Australian women